Nogometni klub Kovinar Štore, commonly referred to as NK Kovinar Štore or simply Kovinar, is a Slovenian football club which plays in the town of Štore. The club was founded in 1930.

Honours

Slovenian Fourth Division
 Winners: 2003–04

League history since 1991

References

Association football clubs established in 1930
Football clubs in Slovenia
1930 establishments in Slovenia